is a Japanese supernatural, romance manga series written and illustrated by Aya Shouoto. It began serialization in Kadokawa Shoten's shōjo manga magazine Monthly Asuka on July 24, 2013. The manga has been licensed in North America by Viz Media in 2014. It is also published in France by Soleil, in Poland by Waneko, and in Taiwan by Kadokawa Taiwan Corporation.

Plot
On her 16th birthday, the orphan Momochi Himari, unexpectedly receives the old Momochi family estate as inheritance. Despite the warnings she received about the house being haunted, having no other place to go, she decides to move there anyway. Upon her arrival she discovers that the house is occupied illegally by three handsome young men: Aoi, Yukari and Ise. The three immediately warn the unaware Himari that she must leave the house as soon as possible, using the story of the ghosts and curses as well, but she does not give up. Soon, she discovers that it is all true: her home appears to be on the border between the human and the spirit worlds, and she was destined to be the guardian between the two, but her role is already taken by Aoi.

Characters

It has been stated in the manga that Himari's parents passed away, most likely when she was very young and has been an orphan ever since. It is unclear if she has any siblings before the incident or how her parents passed on. By having the blood of the Momochi family running in her veins, she is supposed to be the next Omamori-sama or, 'Nue', the guardian of the Momochi House when she receives the will of her family when she turns 16. This would make her the guardian of the Momochi House which is located on the border of the human and spirit world, which would fall under the guardian's protection and monitoring, However, that role has been taken by Aoi and now, she only holds the power to expel anyone from the house if she wishes hard enough due to her bloodline.

He is human, but he became the Omamori-sama at the age of 10 while trying to run away from something, he broke the seal and entered in the Momochi house, this forced him to become its guardian. The house has erased all the traces of his existence in the human world, which is why it seems that neither his family nor friends remember him. In the Nue form, he is a spirit with cat ears, bird feathers and foxtail.

He is Aoi's first shikigami, a serving spirit, in his demonic form he has the appearance of a Mizuchi, a water snake. In his past life he was human, wrongly accused of being a demon, given as a sacrifice to the dragon god Ryujin, the god took pity on him and allowed him to be reborn as an Ayakashi of his own species. He is very kind and does all the houseworks.

He is Aoi's second shikigami, in his demonic form he has the appearance of a Shōjō, an orangutan. He is the youngest of his species, for breaking the law by releasing his powers to the human world, the elders of his tribe fitted him with a cursed collar and warned him if he broke the law again, the curse would destroy his body. In order to save a friend, he ended up breaking the law so Aoi made Ise his shikigami to dissolve the curse and save him. Before arriving at the Momochi house, he enjoyed observing humans and sometimes playing pranks on them. Unlike Yukari, he is very grumpy.

He is a gatekeeper in the spirit realm, he aspired to become the new Omamori-sama, but the Nue, to keep him at bay, forced him to become one of his shikigami. He too, in his past life, was human.

A powerful Ayakashi, he has a deep obsession towards the Nue, and is his biggest rival. To fight boredom, he enjoys annoying the members of the Momochi household, and his arrival usually announces big troubles.

A childhood friend of Aoi who still has some fragments of his memories with him. He is the descendant of a family that had the power to control the Kuda-gitsune, a fox-like spirit, although he demonstrated that he did not inherit this ability, he still has some connection with the spirit world.

Release

Reception
Rebecca Silverman from Anime News Network said that the artwork is similar to that of Kamisama Kiss and Natsume's Book of Friends, but admitted that Aya's art has become more refined compared to before. She pointed out that the manga is easy to read and the story development is interesting because it leaves some questions in readers' minds. In a review of the first volume, Kate O’Neil of Fandom Post wrote that she didn't see anything new in the manga, but praised the author for its colour artwork. She also said that it looks to her like a blend of many shōjo manga. The 6th volume ranked 6th in The New York Times manga best seller list in October 2016.

References

External links
  at Monthly Asuka 
  at Kadokawa Shoten 
 

Fantasy anime and manga
Kadokawa Shoten manga
Romance anime and manga
Shōjo manga
Viz Media manga